The 2000–01 Luxembourg Cup was the 76th season of Luxembourg's annual cup competition. It began on September 2, 2000 with Round 1 and finished on May 24, 2001.

Round 1
Fifty-two teams from Division 2 (IV) and Division 3 (V) entered in this round. Forty of them competed in matches, with the other twelve teams were awarded a bye. The games were played on September 3, 2008.

|colspan="3" style="background-color:#99CCCC"|2-6 September 2000

Bye: US Sandweiler, FC UNA Strassen, FC Yellow Boys Weiler-la-Tour, FC Egalité Weimerskirch, AS Colmarberg, FC Marisca Mersch, FC Etoile Sportive Schouweiler, CS Bourscheid.

Round 2

|colspan="3" style="background-color:#99CCCC"|7 October 2000

Round 3

|colspan="3" style="background-color:#99CCCC"|22 February 2001

|-
|colspan="3" style="background-color:#99CCCC"|23 February 2001

|-
|colspan="3" style="background-color:#99CCCC"|24 February 2001

|-
|colspan="3" style="background-color:#99CCCC"|11 April 2001

Round 4

|colspan="3" style="background-color:#99CCCC"|22 April 2001

|}

Quarter finals

|colspan="3" style="background-color:#99CCCC"|9 May 2001

Semi finals

|colspan="3" style="background-color:#99CCCC"|16 May 2001

Final

External links
 RSSSF page 
 Private homepage about everything regarding Luxembourg soccer 

Luxembourg Cup seasons
Luxembourg Cup, 2000-01
Luxembourg Cup, 2000-01